Lunamarine (punarnavine) is a quinolone alkaloid present in Boerhavia diffusa (punarnava).

The compound has shown some in vitro anticancer, antiestrogenic, immunomodulatory, and anti-amoebic activity (particularly against Entamoeba histolytica).

References 

4-Quinolones
Quinoline alkaloids
Benzodioxoles
Phenol ethers